Mario Della-Fina (born 17 July 1898, date of death unknown) was an Italian racing cyclist. He rode in the 1926 Tour de France.

References

1898 births
Year of death missing
Italian male cyclists
Place of birth missing